"Out of Nowhere" is a popular song composed by Johnny Green with lyrics by Edward Heyman and published by Famous Music. It was popularized by Bing Crosby, and was the first recording under his Brunswick Records contract. He recorded it on March 30, 1931 and it became his first number one hit as a solo artist. Crosby also sang it in the film Confessions of a Co-Ed (1931) and in his short film I Surrender Dear (1931). He recorded it again in 1954 for his album Bing: A Musical Autobiography.

Other 1931 recordings were by Leo Reisman and his Orchestra (vocal by Frank Munn) which reached No. 6 in the charts of the day, Smith Ballew and his Orchestra, Ruth Etting,  and Roy Fox and His band (vocal: Al Bowlly) recorded July 31, 1931. (Al Bowlly Discography).

The song's harmonic progression has been used in several later songs, such as Alexander Courage's "Theme from Star Trek", Tadd Dameron's "Casbah", Fats Navarro's "Nostalgia", Gigi Gryce's "Sans Souci", and Lennie Tristano's "317 East 32nd Street."

It has become a jazz standard, with dozens of instrumental and vocal versions by various artists.

Other recordings
 Ray Anthony - Ray Anthony Plays for Dream Dancing (1956)
 Dave Brubeck with Paul Desmond – Jazz Goes to College (1954)
 Don Byas – recorded as "You Came Along" on June 27, 1945 for Jamboree
 Vic Damone – That Towering Feeling (1956) and Closer Than a Kiss (1959).
 Ella Fitzgerald – recorded June 29, 1939 as a single for Decca
 Russell Garcia – The Johnny Evergreens (1958), with John Williams on piano and Don Fagerquist on trumpet
 Stephan Grappelli with Django Reinhardt (1939)
 Coleman Hawkins with Benny Carter and Django Reinhardt (1937)
 Lena Horne  with Teddy Wilson and His Orchestra – recorded September 15, 1941 for Columbia
 Frank Ifield - released March 31, 1967 Columbia Records 45 RPM Disc
 Bunk Johnson – Last Testament (1947)
 Patti Page – In the Land of Hi-Fi (1956)
 Charlie Parker with Miles Davis (1947)
 Anthony Perkins – On a Rainy Afternoon (1958) (RCA)
 Frank Sinatra with the Tommy Dorsey Orchestra – recorded July 30, 1942
 Art Tatum – (1947)
 Chet Baker – "Rare Chet"

Film appearances
 1931 Dude Ranch
 1931 Confessions of a Co-Ed – sung by Bing Crosby
 1931 I Surrender Dear – sung by Bing Crosby
 1945 You Came Along – sung by Helen Forrest
1951 A Place in the Sun - arr. by Franz Waxman
 1954 Sabrina – instrumental
 1957 The Joker Is Wild – sung by Frank Sinatra, parody lyrics by Harry Harris
 1959 The Rat Race
 1969 They Shoot Horses, Don't They?
 1974 The Conversation
 1987 September – Bert Ambrose and His Orchestra
 1993 Manhattan Murder Mystery – Coleman Hawkins and His All-Star Jam Band
 1997 Deconstructing Harry – Django Reinhardt
 1999 Sweet and Lowdown – Dick Hyman

See also
List of 1930s jazz standards

References

1930s jazz standards
1931 songs
Songs with lyrics by Edward Heyman
Songs with music by Johnny Green
Al Hirt songs
Jazz compositions in G major
Bing Crosby songs
Al Bowlly songs